CD3e molecule, epsilon also known as CD3E is a polypeptide which in humans is encoded by the CD3E gene which resides on chromosome 11.

Function 

The protein encoded by this gene is the CD3-epsilon polypeptide, which together with CD3-gamma, -delta and -zeta, and the T-cell receptor alpha/beta and gamma/delta heterodimers, forms the T cell receptor-CD3 complex. This complex plays an important role in coupling antigen recognition to several intracellular signal-transduction pathways. The genes encoding the epsilon, gamma and delta polypeptides are located in the same cluster on chromosome 11. The epsilon polypeptide plays an essential role in T-cell development.

Clinical significance 

Defects in this gene cause severe immunodeficiency. This gene has also been linked to a susceptibility to type I diabetes in women.

Interactions 

T-cell surface glycoprotein CD3 epsilon chain has been shown to interact with TOP2B, CD3EAP and NCK2.

See also 

 CD3 (immunology)
 Cluster of differentiation

References

Further reading 

 
 
 
 
 
 
 
 
 
 
 
 
 
 
 
 
 
 
 
 

Clusters of differentiation